Brainpool may refer to:

 Brainpool TV, a German television production company
 Brainpool (band), a Swedish pop group
 ECC Brainpool, standard curves in elliptic curve cryptography